This is a list of South African television related events from 2001.

Events
26 August - The South African version of Big Brother debuts on M-Net.
9 December - The first season of Big Brother is won by Ferdinand Rabie.

Debuts

Domestic
26 August - Big Brother (M-Net) (2001-2002, 2014–present)

International
4 January - / Orson and Olivia (SABC2)
7 January -  King of the Hill (SABC3)
8 April -  Kleo the Misfit Unicorn (SABC2)
18 April -  Three Forever (SABC2)
7 May -  Fortune Quest (SABC2)
15 June -  Nikki (M-Net)
21 June -  The Mole (M-Net)
10 August -  Dark Angel (SABC3)
23 August -  Yes, Dear (SABC2)
23 August -  CSI: Crime Scene Investigation (M-Net)
4 September -  Grounded for Life (M-Net)
10 September -  Girlfriends (SABC1)
7 November -  Judging Amy (SABC2)
11 December -  What About Joan? (M-Net)
 Capertown Cops (M-Net)
// The Hoobs (M-Net)
 The Legend of Tarzan (SABC1)
 Kampung Boy (SABC2)
 Eugenie Sandler P.I. (M-Net)
 As Told by Ginger (K-T.V. World)
// Britt Allcroft’s Magic Adventures of Mumfie (SABC2)
/ George Shrinks (M-Net)
/ 3 Friends and Jerry (SABC2)
 Dinozaurs (M-Net)
 X-Men: Evolution (M-Net)
 God, the Devil and Bob (M-Net)
 Lloyd in Space (SABC1)
 Yoho Ahoy (e.tv)
 Anne of Green Gables: The Animated Series (M-Net)
 Marsupilami (2000) (Bop TV)
 Sheeep (SABC2)
// Rainbow Fish (SABC2)
 Action Man (2000) (M-Net)
 Hi-5 (M-Net)
 X-DuckX (M-Net)
// Milo's Bug Quest (M-Net)
/ A Miss Mallard Mystery (M-Net)
// Anthony Ant (SABC2)
 Sheep in the Big City (M-Net)
 Coupling (e.tv)
// Seven Little Monsters (M-Net)
 The Book of Pooh (SABC1)
 Teacher's Pet (SABC1)
 Even Stevens (M-Net)
///// Animated Tales of the World (SABC2)
 Disney's House of Mouse (SABC1)
 Jay Jay the Jet Plane (Bop TV)
 Buzz Lightyear of Star Command (SABC1)
/ Marvin the Tap-Dancing Horse (M-Net)

Changes of network affiliation

Television shows

1980s
Good Morning South Africa (1985–present)
Carte Blanche (1988–present)

1990s
Top Billing (1992–2020)
Generations (1994–present)
Isidingo (1998–present)
Who Wants to Be a Millionaire? (1999-2005)

Ending this year

Births

Deaths

See also
2001 in South Africa